Ljubinka Janković (born 23 September 1958 in Badovinci village near Bogatić, Serbia, former Yugoslavia) is a former Yugoslav handball player who competed in the 1984 Summer Olympics and in the 1988 Summer Olympics.

In 1984 she was a member of the Yugoslav handball team that won the gold medal. She played all five matches and scored six goals.

Four years later, she was part of the Yugoslav team that finished fourth. She played all five matches and scored ten goals.

External links
profile

1958 births
Living people
People from Badovinci
Yugoslav female handball players
Serbian female handball players
Handball players at the 1984 Summer Olympics
Handball players at the 1988 Summer Olympics
Olympic handball players of Yugoslavia
Olympic gold medalists for Yugoslavia
Olympic medalists in handball
Medalists at the 1984 Summer Olympics